Marojević is a Croatian, Serbian and Montenegrin surname. It may refer to:

Zoran Marojević (born 1942) Yugoslav Serbian former basketball player
Igor Marojević (born 1968) Serbian writer
Novi Marojević (born 1973) Montenegrin footballer

Serbian surnames
Croatian surnames
Montenegrin surnames